2000–01 Croatian First A League was the tenth season of the Croatian handball league since its independence and the last season of the First A League format. Badel 1862 Zagreb won the league after a controversial final against Metković Jambo.

League tables and results

League table

Championship play-offs 
The semi-final winner was decided to the club who won two matches, but the final was decided to the club that won three matches.

Sources 
 Fredi Kramer, Dražen Pinević: Hrvatski rukomet = Croatian handball, Zagreb, 2009.; page 179 
 Petar Orgulić: 50 godina rukometa u Rijeci, Rijeka, 2005; pages 272, 273

References

External links
Croatian Handball Federation

2000-01
handball
handball
Croatia